Ora Pro Nobis is a 1917 British silent drama film directed by Rex Wilson.

Cast
 Henry Victor as Lord Osborne  
 Harding Thomas as The Organist  
 Elizabeth Calkin as The Child

References

Bibliography
 Palmer, Scott. British Film Actors' Credits, 1895-1987. McFarland, 1998.

External links
 

1917 films
1917 drama films
British drama films
British silent feature films
Films directed by Rex Wilson
British black-and-white films
1910s English-language films
1910s British films
Silent drama films